Herbert George McQuaid (March 29, 1899 – April 4, 1966) was a  Major League Baseball pitcher. In 29 career games, he had a 2–0 record, with a 4.33 ERA. He batted and threw right-handed.

McQuaid was born in San Francisco, California, and died in Richmond, California.

External links

1899 births
1966 deaths
Cincinnati Reds players
New York Yankees players
Major League Baseball pitchers
Baseball players from California